Liberty: In Our Cosmos (alternatively titled Cravity 1st Album Part 2 [Liberty: In Our Cosmos]) is the second studio album by South Korean boy band Cravity. It was released on March 22, 2022, by Starship Entertainment and distributed by Kakao Entertainment.

The album was a commercial success, debuting and peaking at number one on the South Korean Gaon Album Chart.

Singles
"Adrenaline" is the lead single from the album. The song entered and peaked at number 7 on the Gaon Download Chart on the chart issue dated week of March 20–26, 2022. The song is Cravity's first lead single to chart in the top ten of the Gaon Download Chart.

Promotions
The group's promotions for the song "Adrenaline" began on Mnet's M Countdown on March 24, 2022. The promotion continued on KBS2's Music Bank on March 25, MBC's Music Core on March 26, and SBS Inkigayo on March 27, capping off the first week of promotions.

Track listing

Charts

Weekly charts

Monthly charts

Year-end charts

Release history

See also
 List of Gaon Album Chart number ones of 2022

References

2022 albums
Cravity albums
Starship Entertainment albums